Great Bridgeford railway station served the village of Great Bridgeford, Staffordshire, England from 1837 to 1959 on the Stafford-Manchester line.

History

First station 
The first station opened as Bridgeford on 4 July 1837 by the Grand Junction Railway. It had two platforms. It closed on 10 September 1840.

Second station 
The second station was built by the London and North Western Railway some distance from the site of the former station and was named Great Bridgeford. This station had four platforms. It opened on 1 December 1876, closed to passengers on 8 August 1949 and to goods traffic in 1959.

Accident 
On 17 June 1932 at 7:23pm, an express train derailed at the south end of the station. Four passengers were killed and 27 were injured, 9 of these severely, including the driver. A further 24 people, including the guard, suffered minor injuries.

References

External links 

Disused railway stations in Staffordshire
Former London and North Western Railway stations
Railway stations in Great Britain opened in 1837
Railway stations in Great Britain closed in 1949
1837 establishments in England
1959 disestablishments in England